Hydrangea quercifolia, commonly known as oakleaf hydrangea or oak-leaved hydrangea, is a species of flowering plant in the family Hydrangeaceae. It is native to the southeastern United States, in woodland habitats from North Carolina west to Tennessee, and south to Florida and Louisiana.  A deciduous shrub with white showy flower heads, it is grown as a garden plant, with numerous cultivars available commercially.

Its specific epithet combines the Latin words quercus ("oak"), and folium ("leaf"). However, it is not closely related to oak species (Quercus).

Description
The plant sprouts shoots from underground stolons and often grows in colonies. Young stems are covered in a felt-like light brown bark, and the larger stems have attractive cinnamon-tan-orange bark that shreds and peels in thin flakes.

The leaves are yellowish green to dark green on top and silvery-white underneath. They have three, five or seven pointed lobes and are 4–12 in (10.2–30.5 cm) long and almost as wide. They vaguely resemble larger versions of oak leaves, similar to Quercus species with lobed foliage. Plants in shade have larger leaves than those grown in sun. The leaves turn rich shades of red, bronze and purple in autumn that persist in winter accompanying the persistent dried flower-heads.

Flowers
Hydrangea quercifolia flowers are borne in erect panicles 6–12 in (15.2–30.5 cm) tall and 3–5 in (7.6–12.7 cm) wide at branch tips. Flowers age in colour from creamy white, aging to pink and by autumn and winter are a dry, papery rusty-brown.

Unlike bigleaf hydrangea (Hydrangea macrophylla), flower color does not vary with soil pH.

Hydrangea quercifolia and Hydrangea paniculata are the only hydrangeas with cone-shaped flower clusters; all the others have their flowers in ball-shaped or flat-topped clusters, called umbels.

Distribution
Hydrangea quercifolia is native to the south eastern United States (Alabama, Florida, Georgia (w.), Louisiana (e.), Mississippi, North Carolina, South Carolina, Tennessee), but naturalized in other parts of the US and widely cultivated elsewhere.

Uses

Garden history
Hydrangea quercifolia was noted by 18th-century botanist William Bartram in his botanizing exploration from the Carolinas to the Florida panhandle in the 1770s. It was slow to enter British and American gardens. In Britain it flowers less profusely and even has a reputation for being tender.

Cultivation
Hydrangea quercifolia is cultivated as an ornamental plant in gardens and parks. Though frequently seen as an isolated subject in gardens, it is at its best in a natural or landscaped woodland habitat against the backdrop of larger shrubs and trees. It prefers partial to almost full shade, with morning sun and afternoon shade as optimal. It will tolerate drought, but may not flower. It prefers slightly acidic soils with a pH of 5.0–6.5. In the UK the cultivars =‘Brido’ and =‘Flemygea’ have gained the Royal Horticultural Society's Award of Garden Merit.

Its hardiness is USDA Zones 5–9, with 'Snow Queen' hardy to Zone 5, while some other cultivars may not be. Propagation is via cutting or division; short sections of clustered stems with some root attached will make a small shrub in a nursery row.

Fresh or dry, the blossoms of Hydrangea quercifolia are attractive as cut flowers.

Symbolism
Hydrangea quercifolia was declared the official state wildflower of Alabama in 1999.

Gallery

References

External links

Georgia Wildlife Federation: Hydrangea quercifolia
Hydrangea Thoughts I: Essay on Hydrangeas - Culture, History and Etymology. — (non-scholarly but informative)
Hydrangeas.com: Oakleaf Hydrangea Hydrangea quercifolia — Information on growing Oakleaf hydrangeas
Heronswood Nursery: "Hydrangea Care and Culture"

quercifolia
Flora of the Southeastern United States
Garden plants of North America
Shrubs
Symbols of Alabama